Conus aurisiacus, common name the aurisiacus cone, is a species of sea snail, a marine gastropod mollusk in the family Conidae, the cone snails and their allies.

Like all species within the genus Conus, these snails are predatory and venomous. They are capable of "stinging" humans, therefore live ones should be handled carefully or not at all.

Description 
The size of the shell varies between 43 mm and 95 mm. The shell shows slight revolving ridges, sometimes granulated below. The spire is channeled and striate. The color of the shell is pink-white, with deeper-colored bands, distantly encircled by lines of short dashes and dots of chocolate. The spire shows conspicuous chocolate markings.

Distribution 
This marine species occurs off the Philippines and Australia.

References 

 Linnaeus, C. (1758). Systema Naturae per regna tria naturae, secundum classes, ordines, genera, species, cum characteribus, differentiis, synonymis, locis. Editio decima, reformata. Laurentius Salvius: Holmiae. ii, 824 pp 
 Puillandre N., Duda T.F., Meyer C., Olivera B.M. & Bouchet P. (2015). One, four or 100 genera? A new classification of the cone snails. Journal of Molluscan Studies. 81: 1–23

External links 
 The Conus Biodiversity website
 Cone Shells – Knights of the Sea
 

aurisiacus
Gastropods described in 1758
Taxa named by Carl Linnaeus